Jacob Hjelte (born 8 November 1996) is a Swedish footballer who plays for Sandvikens IF as a forward.

References

External links
 (archive)

1996 births
Living people
Association football forwards
Gefle IF players
Sandvikens IF players
Allsvenskan players
Superettan players
Swedish footballers